Wheatley Hill is a village in County Durham, in England. It is situated to the west of Peterlee, near Thornley and Wingate. Until 2009 it was part of Easington district.

References

External links

 Wheatley Hill History Club
 Wheatley Hill History

 
Villages in County Durham
Civil parishes in County Durham